James Linn (1749January 5, 1821) was a politician who served as a United States representative from New Jersey, serving one term from 1799 to 1801.

Early life
Linn was born in Bedminster Township in the Province of New Jersey in 1749.  He was the son of Margaret (née Kirkpatrick) and Judge Alexander Linn, an Irish immigrant who became a prominent Judge in Somerset County. An uncle, Joseph Linn, was a prominent landowner and paymaster during the Revolution.

He pursued preparatory studies and graduated from Princeton College in 1769.

Career
After graduating, he was the librarian of the college for a year, then studied law, was admitted to the bar in 1772 and commenced practice in Trenton.

He returned to Somerset County and was judge of the Court of Common Pleas; he was a member of the Provincial Congress of New Jersey in 1776.

During the Revolutionary War he served as captain in the Somerset County Militia in 1776, and first major from 1776 to 1781 under William Alexander, Lord Stirling.  He was a member of the New Jersey Legislative Council (now the New Jersey Senate) in 1777, and returned to Trenton; he served in the New Jersey General Assembly in 1790 and 1791, and from 1793 to 1797 was again a member of the State Council serving as Vice-President of Council from October 24, 1796, to October 23, 1797.

Linn was elected as a Republican to the Sixth Congress, serving from March 4, 1799, to March 3, 1801; he was not a candidate for renomination in 1800 to the Seventh Congress.

He was appointed by President Thomas Jefferson to be supervisor of the revenue and served from 1801 to 1809, and from 1809 to 1820 he served as the Democratic-Republican Secretary of State of New Jersey, which "strengthened his control of the party in the state."

Personal life
On May 27, 1771, Linn was married to Mary Livingston (b. 1749), the daughter of Susannah (née French) Livingston and William Livingston, the future 1st Governor of New Jersey of the prominent Livingston family. They were the parents of:

 Evelina Belmont Linn (1803–1886), who married Rev. Dr. Daniel Veech McLean (1801–1869), a Presbyterian minister and the fifth president of Lafayette College, in 1830.

Upon his father's death in 1776, he inherited his family's 664-acre estate, which included 20 slaves, in Mine Brook Valley.  After his first wife's death, he remarried to Penelope Alexander.

Linn died in Trenton, New Jersey on January 5, 1821, and was survived by his widow and a married daughter.   He was buried at the Lamington Presbyterian Church Cemetery in Somerset County, New Jersey.

Descendants
Through his only surviving daughter Evelina, he was the grandfather of Evelina Linn McLean (d. 1840), who died young, and Princeton graduate and lawyer, James Linn McLean (1834–1914), who married Amanda Mixsell. After her death, he married Josephine S. Dunbar (b. 1844).  In 1871, McLean served a term in the West Virginia State Legislature.

References

External links
 

1749 births
1821 deaths
Princeton University alumni
Members of the New Jersey Legislative Council
Members of the New Jersey General Assembly
Secretaries of State of New Jersey
Democratic-Republican Party members of the United States House of Representatives from New Jersey
People from Bedminster, New Jersey
Politicians from Somerset County, New Jersey